Media, Culture & Society is a peer-reviewed academic journal that covers media studies. The  editors-in-chief are Raymond Boyle, (University of Glasgow), John Corner (University of Leeds), Anna Reading (King's College London), Paddy Scannell (University of Michigan), Philip Schlesinger (University of Glasgow), and Colin Sparks (Hong Kong Baptist University). It was established in 1979 and is published by SAGE Publications.

Abstracting and indexing 
The journal is abstracted and indexed in Scopus and the Social Sciences Citation Index. According to the Journal Citation Reports, its 2013 impact factor is 1.139.

References

External links 
 

SAGE Publishing academic journals
English-language journals
Media studies journals
Publications established in 1979